Regis University is a private Jesuit university in Denver, Colorado.

Founded in 1877 by the Society of Jesus, the university offers more than 120 degrees through 5 colleges in a variety of subjects, including education, liberal arts, business, nursing, and technology. It is accredited by the Higher Learning Commission.

History
In 1877, a group of exiled Italian Jesuits established a small college in Las Vegas, New Mexico.  The Jesuits named this institution Las Vegas College which would ultimately become known as Regis University.

In 1884, the Bishop of Denver invited the Jesuits to create a college in Morrison, Colorado where Sacred Heart College was opened. In 1887, Las Vegas College and Sacred Heart College merged and moved to the present location of Regis University.  At the time of the merger, the school was then called the College of the Sacred Heart.  Later, in 1921, it adopted the name of Regis College in honor of Saint John Francis Regis, a 17th-century Jesuit who worked with prostitutes and the poor in the mountains of Southern France. The preparatory section was separated to become the present-day Regis Jesuit High School.

In 1991, Regis College was renamed Regis University.

Regis University played host to the rock musician Jimi Hendrix in 1968, as well as the British rock band Queen (band) who played their first concert in the United States on April 16, 1974.

In 2011, Regis academic programs expanded with partnerships with the National University of Ireland, Galway, and with ITESO, the Jesuit University of Guadalajara, Mexico, for the first online bilingual joint MBA degree program.

Michael Sheeran stepped down as the university's president on June 1, 2012.  Sheeran was succeeded by John P. Fitzgibbons, S.J., who became the 24th president of the university.

Guest speakers
Desmond Tutu spoke at the university in November 1998, following in the footsteps of Betty Williams of Northern Ireland and the Dalai Lama in 1993.

Other speakers have included author Elie Wiesel in 2001, former President of Poland Lech Walesa in 2003, and most recently, David Trimble of Northern Ireland in 2006. Altogether, 13 Nobel Peace Prize recipients have visited Regis University since 1996.

Papal visit
On August 12, 1993, Pope John Paul II visited the Northwest Denver Campus of Regis University, where he met with President Bill Clinton for the first time.  They greeted about 150 visitors, who had been chosen through a lottery system, and met privately for an hour in the President's Dining Room of Carroll Hall.

Schools

Regis College
Regis College houses the traditional, undergraduate (and Masters of Art in Education & Masters of Science in Biomedical Sciences) programs. These programs are designed for recent high school graduates, or transfer students, with little or no professional work experience. Regis college offers a choice of majors, minors, emphases, and pre-professional tracks.  Students wishing to enter the nursing, physical therapy, or pharmacy programs often enter Regis College to complete pre-requisite requirements.

Rueckert-Hartman College for Health Professions
When Regis absorbed her sister school, Loretto Heights College, the Rueckert Hartman College for Health Professions was born.  Regis operates a nationally recognized nursing program, and one of the premiere physical therapist programs. The school is divided into three schools and two divisions: Loretto Heights School of Nursing, School of Pharmacy, School of Physical Therapy, Division of Health Services Education and the Division of Counseling and Family Therapy. The college offers three doctoral programs, Doctor of Nursing Practice (entirely on-line), Doctor of Physical Therapy, and Doctor of Pharmacy.

College of Contemporary Liberal Studies
In 2014, the College for Professional Studies (CPS) was renamed to the College of Contemporary Liberal Studies (CCLS), with the mission of providing a values-centered Jesuit education designed for the adult learner. CCLS students are working professionals, parents and spouses with work, school and family commitments seeking a bachelor's or master's degree from an accredited university. CCLS serves over 9,000 adult students worldwide and offers campus-based, online and directed study formats. CCLS consists of two distinct schools: the School of Humanities and Social Sciences, and the School of Education and Counseling. Both of the schools offers bachelor's and master's degrees and certificate programs. CCLS has been named a Top Military Friendly School for 2012 by GI Jobs.

College of Computer and Information Sciences
In 2014, the College of Computer and Information Sciences was specifically created in order to provide a specialized education in the computer science industry. CC&IS undergraduate programs in Computer Science (CPS), Computer Information Systems, and Computer Networking are ABET accredited. They are the only ABET accredited programs of their kind that, in addition to classroom, are also offered 100% online.

Anderson College of Business
In 2015, the College of Business and Economics was officially established to combine the Regis College Division of Business and the College for Professional Studies School of Management and Master of Nonprofit Management. After a donation made by Denver architect Andy Anderson in 2018, the college was renamed to the Anderson College of Business. The college offers both classroom-based and online course options.

Institute on the Common Good
Founded in 1997 by then-president Michael J. Sheeran, the Institute on the Common Good at Regis University says: "...[it] serves the community...by providing a safe and effective space for community dialogue, communal discernment, and public deliberation...All [these concepts] reflect the Roman Catholic and Jesuit heritage of Regis University and the Institute."

Center for Service Learning
Regis University's Center for Service Learning (CSL) facilitates student voluntary service, the development of service learning components in coursework, and placement among the needier members of society for those with work study awards. These are essential components of the university's mission to train men and women for others.

Athletics

Regis University is in the Rocky Mountain Athletic Conference along with Adams State, Black Hills State, Chadron State, Colorado Christian, Colorado Mines, CSU Pueblo, Dixie State, Fort Lewis, Colorado Mesa, Metro State, New Mexico Highlands, South Dakota Mines, UC-Colorado Springs, Western New Mexico, Westminster, and Western State Colorado. The university offers women's lacrosse, men and women's soccer, baseball, softball, men and women's basketball, volleyball, men and women's cross country, men and women's golf, Men’s Rugby and forensics.

Rankings
Regis University was ranked 202nd among National Universities by U.S. News & World Report in its 2020 rankings.  This was Regis's first year of competition on this national list since it was reclassified in 2019 as a Doctoral Professional University.  It was previously ranked 26th among "Regional Universities West."

Notable alumni
Dewey F. Bartlett Jr., Mayor of Tulsa, Oklahoma
Andrea Booher, Colorado-based photographer, filmmaker and photojournalist
Charles F. Brannan, Former Secretary of Agriculture (1948–53)
Steven Brault, MLB player for the Pittsburgh Pirates
Campbell Brown, Television News Host - CNN
Banny de Brum, Ambassador of the Marshall Islands to the United States (1996–2008, 2009–2011)
Richard N. Cabela, CEO, Cabela's, Inc.
Gil Cisneros, Lottery winner, philanthropist, 11 year Navy veteran and former U.S. Representative for California's 39th congressional district from 2019 to 2021. Cisneros was nominated in 2021 by President Joseph Biden to oversee the Pentagon's Personnel and Readiness Office.
Jim Daly, President and CEO, Focus on the Family
John P. Farley, Actor and comedian, brother of actor Chris Farley
Edwin J. Feulner, founder of the Heritage Foundation, a conservative Washington D.C. thinktank
Victoria Fuller, artist and sculptor
Arnie Herber, NFL Player for the Green Bay Packers and New York Giants, Member of the Pro Football Hall of Fame
Stephen McNichols, Former Colorado Governor 
Joseph Montoya, U.S. Senator from New Mexico
Jack Morris, S.J, founder of the Jesuit Volunteer Corps 
Bill Murray, Actor and comedian, attended but did not graduate, received an Honorary Doctor of Humanities in 2007
Jane E. Norton, Lieutenant Governor of Colorado (2003–07)
Nick "Tasteless" Plott, esports commentator
Dianne Primavera, Lieutenant Governor of Colorado (2019-)
Josephine Siao, Hong Kong actress
Devorah Sperber, Installation Artist
Ken Summers, Colorado Senator (2006–12)
Charity Sunshine Tillemann-Dick, Soprano
Tom White, Member of the Nebraska Legislature

See also
 John J. Brown, S.J. – rector of then–Sacred Heart College
 List of Jesuit sites

References

External links
 
 Regis Athletics website

 
Universities and colleges in Denver
Jesuit universities and colleges in the United States
Catholic universities and colleges in Colorado
Education in Aurora, Colorado
Education in Boulder County, Colorado
Education in Colorado Springs, Colorado
Greenwood Village, Colorado
Education in Broomfield, Colorado
Education in Fort Collins, Colorado
Education in Henderson, Nevada
Summerlin, Nevada
Educational institutions established in 1877
Association of Catholic Colleges and Universities
Roman Catholic Archdiocese of Denver
1877 establishments in Colorado